Vulturnus is a genus of leafhoppers belonging to the family Cicadellidae.

The species of this genus are found in Australia.

Species:
 Vulturnus coloratus Evans, 1972 
 Vulturnus cyclopensis Evans, 1972

References

Cicadellidae
Cicadellidae genera